The 2002 British Speedway Championship was the 42nd edition of the British Speedway Championship. The Final took place on 12 October at Brandon in Coventry, England. The Championship was won by Scott Nicholls, who beat Lee Richardson, David Howe and Mark Loram in the final heat.

Final 
12 October 2002
  Brandon Stadium, Coventry

{| width=100%
|width=50% valign=top|

Qualifying

Final

See also 
 British Speedway Championship

References 

British Speedway Championship
Great Britain